A by-election was held for the New South Wales Legislative Assembly electorate of Heffron on 23 June 1990 because of the resignation of Laurie Brereton to successfully contest the 1990 federal election for  Kingsford Smith The Labor candidate for the election was Deirdre Grusovin, the sister of Brereton.

The Heffron by-election was held the same day as the Granville and Smithfield by-elections.

Dates

Results

Laurie Brereton resigned.

See also
Electoral results for the district of Heffron
List of New South Wales state by-elections

Notes

References

1990 elections in Australia
New South Wales state by-elections
1990s in New South Wales